This is a list of fighter aces in World War II from Hungary. For other countries see List of World War II aces by country.

B

D

F

H

I

K

L

M

N

P

R

S

T

U

References

 Dénes Bernád, György Punka: Hungarian Fighter Colours, volume 2, MMP Books, Poland, 2014.
 György Punka: Hungarian Aces of World War II, Osprey Publishing, Oxford, England, 2002.
 Becze Csaba: Elfelejtett hősök a Magyar Királyi Honvéd Légierő ászai a II. világháborúban, Puedlo, Budapest, 2006.

 
World War II flying aces
Hungary